Events from the year 1758 in Scotland.

Incumbents

Law officers 
 Lord Advocate – Robert Dundas the younger
 Solicitor General for Scotland – Andrew Pringle of Alemore

Judiciary 
 Lord Justice Clerk – Lord Tinwald

Events 
 Physician Francis Home makes the first attempt to deliver a measles vaccine.

Births 
 17 February – John Pinkerton, antiquarian and cartographer (died 1826)
 21 March – Patrick Beatson, mariner and shipbuilder in Quebec (died 1800 in Canada)
 23 April – Alexander Cochrane, admiral (died 1832 in France)
 9 September – Alexander Nasmyth, portrait and landscape painter (died 1840)
 31 October – Jean Glover, poet and singer (died 1801 in Ireland)
 Alexander Mackenzie Fraser, born Alexander Mackenzie, British Army general (died 1809 in the Netherlands)

Deaths 
 7 January – Allan Ramsay, poet (born 1686)
 17 January – James Hamilton, 6th Duke of Hamilton (born 1724)
 18 July – Duncan Campbell, nobleman and British Army officer (died of wounds received at Battle of Carillon)
 14 October – James Francis Edward Keith, Jacobite, soldier and Prussian field-marshal (born 1696; killed at Battle of Hochkirch)
 27 October (bur.) – Elizabeth Blackwell, botanic writer and illustrator (born 1707; died in London)
 12 November – John Cockburn, politician

See also 

 Timeline of Scottish history
 1758 in Great Britain

References 

 
18th century in Scotland
Years of the 18th century in Scotland
Scotland
1750s in Scotland